Events from the year 1970 in North Korea.

Incumbents
Premier: Kim Il-sung 
Supreme Leader: Kim Il-sung

Events
5th Congress of the Workers' Party of Korea

Births 

 5 March - Ri Gwang-sik.
 24 August - Pak Yong-hui.

See also
Years in Japan
Years in South Korea

References

 
North Korea
1970s in North Korea
Years of the 20th century in North Korea
North Korea